John Cuzzupe (born 11 October 1973) is a former Australian rules footballer who played for Footscray in the Australian Football League (AFL) in 1992. He was recruited from the Braybrook Football Club in the Footscray District Football League (FDFL). Player at Parkside Football Club in 1997.

References

External links

Living people
1973 births
Western Bulldogs players
Braybrook Football Club players
Australian rules footballers from Victoria (Australia)